Apophaula ocellata is a species of beetle in the family Cerambycidae, and the only species in the genus Apophaula. It was described by Lane in 1973.

References

Aerenicini
Beetles described in 1973
Monotypic Cerambycidae genera